Antoine Maurin (Perpignan, 5 November 1793 - Paris, 21 September 1860) was a French lithographer.

References

1793 births
1860 deaths
19th-century French painters
French male painters
19th-century French male artists